Disonycha caroliniana is a species of flea beetle in the family Chrysomelidae.

Discovery
Disonycha caroliniana is found in North America.

References

Further reading

 
 

Alticini
Articles created by Qbugbot
Beetles described in 1775
Taxa named by Johan Christian Fabricius